Mihai Timu (9 May 1922 – 5 August 1968) was a Romanian equestrian. He competed in two events at the 1952 Summer Olympics.

He was killed in a motor vehicle accident, alongside fellow Romanian equestrian Gheorghe Langa.

References

External links
  

1922 births
1968 deaths
Romanian male equestrians
Olympic equestrians of Romania
Equestrians at the 1952 Summer Olympics